The Maple Leaf 45 is a Canadian sailboat that was designed by Stan Huntingford as a cruiser and first built in 1985.

Production
The design was built by Cooper Enterprises in Port Coquitlam, British Columbia, starting in 1985, but the company went out of business in 1990 and it is now out of production.

Design
The Maple Leaf 45 is a recreational keelboat, built predominantly of fibreglass, with wood trim. The hull has a foam core, while the deck is balsa-cored. The boat has a masthead sloop rig, a raked stem, a reverse transom, a skeg-mounted rudder controlled by a wheel mounted in a mid-cockpit and a fixed fin keel. It displaces  and carries  of ballast.

The design has sleeping accommodation for seven people, with a double "V"-berth in the bow cabin, a drop-down dinette table and a straight settee in the main cabin and an aft cabin with a double berth. The galley is located on the port side just forward of the companionway ladder. The galley is "U"-shaped and is equipped with a three-burner stove, ice box and a double sink. A navigation station is opposite the galley, on the starboard side. There are two heads, one just aft of the bow cabin on the port side and one on the port side in the aft cabin.

See also
List of sailing boat types

References

Keelboats
1980s sailboat type designs
Sailing yachts 
Sailboat type designs by Stan Huntingford
Sailboat types built by Cooper Enterprises